Daniel Ben-Ami is a London-based journalist and author specialising in economics and finance. He has written extensively on economic development, the world economy, financial markets and investment funds. He has used the pseudonym Daniel Nassim.

Work 
His work has appeared in general and specialist publications including the Financial Times, The Guardian, The Independent, Prospect, The Sunday Telegraph and The Sunday Times. Generally his more controversial articles have appeared in Spiked and before that the now defunct LM Magazine. He has spoken at public meetings including events organised by the Institute of Ideas, the New York Salon and WORLDwrite. In Europe, he has appeared on BBC Radio 2, BBC Radio 4, BBC Radio 5 Live, BBC News 24, Bloomberg TV, CNBC, CNN and Sky News. In America, he was a guest on the Al Franken Show on Air America Radio and he has appeared on the Counterpoint programme on Australia's ABC Radio National. He has also appeared on the Al Jazeera English language television service.

Books 
"Is Japan different?", in Phil Hammond (ed) Cultural Difference, Media Memories: Anglo-American Images of Japan, Cassell, 1997. 
Cowardly Capitalism: The Myth of the Global Financial Casino, John Wiley and Sons Ltd, 2001. 
Ferraris for all: In defence of economic progress, The Policy Press, 2010.

References

External links 
Ferraris For All website: danielbenami.com
Fund Strategy blog: Strategy Blog
Daniel Ben-Ami, "In defence of abundance", Spiked Online, 29 January 2010
Daniel Ben-Ami, "Who’s afraid of economic growth?", Spiked Online, 4 May 2006
Daniel Ben-Ami, "The dismal quackery of eco-economics", Spiked Online, 22 October 2004
Sky News TV: "Debate with Friends of the Earth on the economics of climate change"
Economic Growth: Bane or Boon? Video of debate between Daniel Ben-Ami and Jonathon Porritt held at Northumbria University, October 2010
Limits to Growth in 21st Century Video of debate between Daniel Ben-Ami, Richard Dyer and Phil O'Keefe as part of The Great Debate Green Phoenix Festival Programme, August 2010
 Profile at SourceWatch

Place of birth missing (living people)
Year of birth missing (living people)
Living people
British male journalists